Fallen also known as Tweak EP is an EP by South African rock band, Tweak, now known as Crashcarburn.

Track listing 
 Fuelling the Flame
 Fallen
 Catch The Wind
 Last Mistake
 Suffocate
 Light the Way

Personnel

Garth Barnes - guitar, vocals
Mike Stott - guitar, backing vocals
Chris Brink - bass guitar, backing vocals
Brendan Barnes - <small>drums

References

2005 EPs
Crashcarburn albums